Le coppie (internationally released as Man and Wife and The Couples) is a 1970 Italian comedy film directed by  Mario Monicelli, Alberto Sordi and Vittorio De Sica. It consists of three segments.

Cast

Il frigorifero
Monica Vitti: Adele Puddu
Enzo Jannacci: Gavino Puddu

La camera
Alberto Sordi: Giacinto Colonna
Rossana Di Lorenzo: his wife Erminia
Abul Kalam Shamsuddin : university teacher of Sardinia

Il leone
Alberto Sordi: Antonio
Monica Vitti: Giulia
Gigi Bonos: Owner of the circus

References

External links

1970 films
Commedia all'italiana
Films directed by Mario Monicelli
Films directed by Vittorio De Sica
Films directed by Alberto Sordi
1970 comedy films
Films set in Turin
Films set in Sardinia
Films set in Lazio
1970s Italian-language films
1970s Italian films